The Canadian province of British Columbia is home to 13 public universities and institutes, as well as 11 colleges.

Public universities and institutions

Public colleges
 Camosun College (Victoria, British Columbia)
 Coast Mountain College (Prince Rupert, Terrace, Smithers, Hazelton, and Haida Gwaii)
 College of New Caledonia (Prince George, Quesnel, Mackenzie, Vanderhoof, Fort St. James, and Burns Lake)
 College of the Rockies (Cranbrook)
 Douglas College (New Westminster and Coquitlam)
 Langara College (Vancouver)
 North Island College (Campbell River, Comox Valley, Port Alberni, Port Hardy, and Ucluelet)
 Northern Lights College (Dawson Creek, Fort St. John, Chetwynd, Fort Nelson)
 Okanagan College (Kelowna, Vernon, Penticton, Salmon Arm, Revelstoke)
 Selkirk College (Castlegar, Nelson, Trail, Grand Forks, Kaslo, and Nakusp)
 Vancouver Community College (Vancouver)

Private colleges and institutes
A list of private colleges and institutes that have been accredited by the Private Training Institutions Branch of the Ministry of Advanced Education, Skills & Training can be found at https://www.privatetraininginstitutions.gov.bc.ca/students/pti-directory

See also
 Higher education in British Columbia
 Higher education in Canada
 List of business schools in Canada
 List of Canadian universities by endowment
 List of colleges in Canada
 List of law schools in Canada
 List of universities in Canada

British Columbia
 
Colleges